Gaylon Hyder (born October 18, 1974) is a former American football defensive tackle. He played for the St. Louis Rams from 1999 to 2000.

References

1974 births
Living people
American football defensive tackles
TCU Horned Frogs football players
St. Louis Rams players
Rhein Fire players
Players of American football from Texas
People from Longview, Texas